Sky100 is a 360-degree indoor observation deck, which offers views of Hong Kong Island, Victoria Harbour, the Kowloon Peninsula and Tai Mo Shan.

History
Sun Hung Kai Properties held a naming contest for the new observation deck. Both the English and Chinese name were selected among 3,000 entries in May 2010.

Facilities
Aside from the view of Hong Kong, Sky100 contains several other attractions including a Paris-style eatery called Café 100 on the west side. Other features include a virtual reality (VR) attraction, augmented reality photo-taking, and a photo booth.

Sky100's Advanced Telescope provides "sunny day setting" and pre-recorded views from bright days, and on-screen indicators point to landmarks. Other settings include night views and fireworks. Interactive touch screens dot the deck, offering facts, tips and an itinerary planner.

Race to ICC-100
Since 2012, Sky100 has also served as the finish point for the annual "Race to ICC-100—SHKP Vertical Run for the Chest", organised by Sun Hung Kai Properties (Developer of the International Commerce Centre) and The Community Chest of Hong Kong.

The race begins at Level 8 and winds its way up the building's staircases to Sky100. The event is normally held in early December.

Opening Hours
Daily 10:00 – 20:30 (last entry: 20:00)

Special Arrangement: https://sky100.com.hk/en/more/plan-your-visit/opening-hours/

Prices
Age 12-64 ($198), 3-11 & 65 or above ($128) / online booking (10% off)

References

External links

Official website
Race to ICC-100—SHKP Vertical Run for the Chest

2011 establishments in Hong Kong
Observation decks
Tourist attractions in Hong Kong
Union Square (Hong Kong)